This article details the Leeds Rhinos 2009 Super League XIV season.

Notable moments

February
 February 6 - The Rhinos kick off their Super League season against the Crusaders, winning 28 – 6 at home.
 February 14 - It was announced that new signing Greg Eastwood had been denied a work visa to play for the Rhinos.

March
 March 1 - Leeds lose the World Club Challenge 20-28 to Manly-Warringah Sea Eagles, at Elland Road.
 March 8 - Leeds beat Warrington Wolves 20-14 to maintain their place at the top of the Super League
 March 13 - Leeds beat Wigan Warriors 34-10 with an impressive performance to open up a two-point gap at the top the Super League.
 March 20 - Leeds lose their first league game of the season, to St Helens

April
 April 4 - Leeds are knocked out of the Challenge Cup in the fourth round by St Helens.
 April 10 - Bradford beat Leeds in the traditional Easter fixture.
 April 13 - Leeds' poor form continues, losing their third Super League fixture in four games, this time to Salford.
 April 18 - Leeds return to winning ways, beating Huddersfield away from home.
 April 24 - Leeds lose to Harlequins, almost being "nilled" for the first time in 11 years, narrowly avoiding this by scoring their only points with the last move of the game.

May

 May 3 - Leeds' Magic Weekend fixture ends in a 16-36 win against Catalans
 May 15 - Leeds beat Castleford with the last kick of the match, a penalty conceded on 79:57 and converted after the hooter sounded.
 May 26 - Keith Senior scores twice in his 300th match for the Leeds Rhinos, who comfortably beat Hull FC at Headingley.

June
 June 6 - Leeds suffer only their second defeat at the hands of Catalans, going down 32-30 in Perpignan to a try awarded by the video referee after the full 80 minutes had elapsed.
 June 14 - Leeds regain second place in the table after beating Huddersfield.

July
 July 4 - Keith Senior plays and scores in his 500th professional match, away at Hull FC.
 July 17 - Leeds come from behind against Hull KR to end the weekend level on points at the top of the table with St Helens.

August
 August 14 - Leeds become the first team to score 70 or more points in Super League XIV, beating Castleford 76 – 12.

September
 September 4 - Rhinos beat St Helens 18-10 to go two points clear at the top of the table.
 September 11 - Leeds beat Salford 30-24 to win the League Leaders' Shield for the first time since 2004.

October

 October 2 - Leeds Rhinos defeat Catalans Dragons 27-20 to progress to the Grand Final for the third year in a row.

 October 10 - Leeds make history, being the first team to win three consecutive Super League Grand Finals, beating Saint Helens 18-10

2009 Squad
As of 7 April 2009

2009 Player Signings/Transfers
Gains

Losses

Coaching Set-Up

2009 Results

* Aggregate attendance for second day of Magic Weekend.

League table

References 

Leeds Rhinos seasons
Leeds Rhinos season
Rugby